Iiro Pakarinen (born 25 August 1991) is a Finnish professional ice hockey player for HIFK of the Finnish elite league (SM-Liiga). Pakarinen previously played in the Finnish Liiga with KalPa and HIFK, Kontinental Hockey League with Jokerit, Metallurg Magnitogorsk and Barys Nur-Sultan. Pakarinen also played in the National Hockey League (NHL) with the Edmonton Oilers.

Playing career
Pakarinen played in his native Finland from his youth level with professional Liiga club, KalPa. As a skilled, versatile forward, Pakarinen was drafted 184th overall in the 2011 NHL Entry Draft by the Florida Panthers. Unable to agree to terms with the Panthers, Pakarinen opted to continue his development in the Finnish Liiga with KalPa. On 3 May 2012, he joined HIFK as a free agent on a two-year contract.

Upon completion of his second season with HIFK in 2013–14 and scoring a career-high 20 goals and 30 points, Pakarinen signed his first NHL contract as a free agent with the Edmonton Oilers on a two-year entry-level deal on 16 June 2014. On 1 December 2017, he was placed on waivers by the Oilers, and was then sent to their AHL affiliate, the Bakersfield Condors, on 2 December.

On 2 July 2018, Pakarinen left the Oilers and the NHL as a free agent, signing a one-year contract with Russian club, Metallurg Magnitogorsk of the KHL. In the 2018–19 season, Pakarinen made as positive impact with Metallurg, producing 19 goals and 26 points in 60 games.

On 2 May 2019, having concluded his contract with Metallurg, Pakarinen continued in the KHL, signing a one-year deal with Kazakh-based, Barys Nur-Sultan. In the following 2019–20 season, Pakarinen suffered an injury-hit year, featuring in just 22 games and registering 10 points. He collected 1 goal in 5 post-season games before the playoffs were canceled due to COVID-19.

On 11 May 2020, Pakarinen opted to return to Finland and remain in the KHL, signing a three-year contract with Jokerit.

Career statistics

Regular season and playoffs

International

References

External links
 

1991 births
Living people
Bakersfield Condors players
Barys Nur-Sultan players
Edmonton Oilers players
Finnish expatriate ice hockey players in the United States
Finnish ice hockey right wingers
Florida Panthers draft picks
HIFK (ice hockey) players
Jokerit players
KalPa players
Metallurg Magnitogorsk players
Oklahoma City Barons players
People from Suonenjoki
Ice hockey players at the 2022 Winter Olympics
Olympic ice hockey players of Finland
Medalists at the 2022 Winter Olympics
Olympic gold medalists for Finland
Olympic medalists in ice hockey
Sportspeople from North Savo
Finnish expatriate ice hockey players in Kazakhstan
Finnish expatriate ice hockey players in Canada
Finnish expatriate ice hockey players in Russia